Glut or GLUT may refer to:

Glöð, a legendary Scandinavian queen, wife of Logi, sometimes considered a goddess
Overproduction, the opposite of underproduction or a shortage
 Glut: Mastering Information Through The Ages, a book by Alex Wright
 Glucose transporter (GLUT), a family of membrane proteins in biology
 OpenGL Utility Toolkit (GLUT), a computer program library
 A large wooden wedge used in wood splitting
 Donald F. Glut (born 1944), American writer and filmmaker
 Glut, a shark in The Little Mermaid; see List of The Little Mermaid characters
 Glut (film), a 1983 drama film